The 1991–92 Washington Huskies men's basketball team represented the University of Washington for the 1991–92 NCAA Division I men's basketball season. Led by third-year head coach Lynn Nance, the Huskies were members of the Pacific-10 Conference and played their home games on campus at Hec Edmundson Pavilion in Seattle, Washington.

There was no conference tournament this season; last played in 1990, it resumed in 2002.

References

External links
Sports Reference – Washington Huskies: 1991–92 basketball season

Washington Huskies men's basketball seasons
Washington Huskies
Washington
Washington